Falcon Futebol Clube, commonly known as Falcon, is a Brazilian football club based in Barra dos Coqueiros, Sergipe. They compete in the Campeonato Sergipano.

Honours

Campeonato Sergipano:
 Runners-up: 2022
 Campeonato Sergipano Série A2:
 Winners (1): 2021

References

External links
Falcon FC on Instagram

Association football clubs established in 2020
2020 establishments in Brazil
Football clubs in Sergipe